Kristopher Lee Carter (born February 5, 1972) is an American composer. He grew up in San Angelo, Texas and lives in Los Angeles, California.

Carter was born in San Antonio, Texas. In 1993, he graduated magna cum laude from the University of North Texas. As a student, he won first prize in the 1992 UNT Concerto/Aria competition with his symphonic overture, A Titan's Epitaph. The University of North Texas Symphony Orchestra, under the direction of Anshel Brusilow, first performed the overture in 1993. After that, Carter received commissions for concert works from cellist Carter Enyeart, saxophonist Robert Austin and the University of North Texas Men's Chorus. The work commissioned by Austin, Grand Duo Concertante, has been featured on several nationally syndicated college radio programs.

Carter began his career as one of the youngest composers to work for Warner Bros. He received an Emmy Award for Batman Beyond and has received five other Emmy nominations. His fifteen independent feature films have screened at festivals including South by Southwest, Slamdance, the Atlanta Film Festival, Shriekfest and the 2008 Park City Film Music Festival, where his feature "Yesterday Was A Lie" won a Gold Medal for Best Impact Of Music In A Feature Film.

He made his Hollywood Bowl debut in 2001 with a commission from John Mauceri and the Hollywood Bowl Orchestra. In the record world, he has collaborated with The Wallflowers' Rami Jaffee and blues guitarist Kenny Wayne Shepherd. Carter was named Commissioning Composer of the Year by the Texas Music Teachers Association and also received a fellowship to Robert Redford's Sundance Composers Institute. He served as the first Composer-In-Residence of the Bel Canto Northwest Opera Festival and has given clinics across the country on film composition.

Works

DC Animated Universe

Other DC Animated Works

Marvel animated works

Other animated works

Other works

This work that was composed with other music composers, especially with Michael McCuistion and Lolita Ritmanis.
The work was composed solely by Carter.
The work that has theme song composed by Carter.

References

External links 
 
 

American film score composers
American male film score composers
American male classical composers
American classical composers
Texas classical music
University of North Texas College of Music alumni
Living people
1972 births
La-La Land Records artists